The Olomouc Synagogue, located in Olomouc, Czech Republic, was built in 1897 and was destroyed during a Nazi attack in March 1939.

History
In the late 1850s, Olomouc's "Izraelitische Cultusverein", the religious society, was founded. The institution of regular worship in rented halls in 1859 was due to the efforts of Hermann Zweig and the well-known Jewish scholar and physician Adolf Brecher. These services were officially approved by the authorities in 1860; and in 1863, an entire floor, which was subsequently acquired by the community, was dedicated by the Rev. Dr. Schmiedl, at that time of Prossnitz, and subsequently of Vienna. In 1892, the "Cultusverein" was changed into a "Cultusgemeinde", and its constitution was confirmed two years later in conformity with the law of March 20, 1890. It was then that the notion of building a synagogue arose. In 1894, the community purchased a site adjacent to the Teresian Gate. The handsome new synagogue, designed by Jakob Gärtner (1861–1921), was completed in and duly consecrated by Rabbi Berthold Oppenheim, the first rabbi of the community, on April 11, 1897.  A two-story building with flats and offices for administrative use was built adjacent to the synagogue. In 1904, the town of 21,933 had a Jewish population of 1,676.

The edifice was one of the biggest and finest synagogues in Czechoslovakia, but was so for only half of a century. On the night of March 15–16, 1939, the synagogue was attacked and burned to ashes. The Nazi instigators refused to let the town's firemen to extinguish the flames. Looters salvaged what remained of the synagogue's ornaments and furnishings until 1941 when the whole area was transformed into a grassy park.

Two Torah scrolls were salvaged and moved to a repository in Prague. They were among the more than 1,500 sent to the Jewish Museum in Prague in 1942 for safekeeping. In the early 1960s, British attorney and philanthropist Ralph Yablon purchased the scrolls from the Czechoslovakian government and donated them to London's Westminster Synagogue, which established the Memorial Scrolls Trust that loaned them to synagogues around the world, with most going to U.S. synagogues. In 1970 one of the scrolls was loaned to Peninsula Sinai Congregation in Foster City, California, where it was used for religious services.

The Olomouc Jewish community has now been reborn after being decimated by the Nazis, and in 2016 they reached out to PSC and requested the return of its scroll. Damage to its Hebrew lettering has made it unfit, or "unkosher," for use in religious ceremonies in recent years. The PSC community, led by Rabbi Corey Helfand, had the scroll restored by sofer (scribe) Rabbi Moshe Druin. In October 2017, Rabbi Helfand, Cantor Doron Shapira, Dr. Linda Oberstein, Steve Lipman, Ron and Liz Mester, and Andrea Hawksley and Andy Lutomirski, accompanied Torah back to its home in Olomouc, where they were also joined by Rabbi Druin. At a ceremony on October 22, 2017, the last letters were restored, and the scroll was festively installed in the Jewish prayer room on the occasion of the Jewish Culture Days in Olomouc. It was the first Torah returned out of the 1,500 Bohemian and Moravian scrolls that are stored outside the Czech Republic.

Gallery

References

External links

 Summer Workshop Virtual Olomouc Tour: The Former Synagogue
  

Buildings and structures in Olomouc
Former synagogues in the Czech Republic
Orthodox Judaism in the Czech Republic
Orthodox synagogues
Synagogues destroyed by Nazi Germany
Moorish Revival synagogues
Moorish Revival architecture in the Czech Republic
Synagogues completed in 1897
19th-century religious buildings and structures in the Czech Republic